is a Japanese male professional volleyball player from Tokyo. He currently plays in V.League Division 1 for JTEKT Stings and Japan men's national volleyball team. He used to be the captain of Japan U-21 national team in 2012 Asian Junior Men's Volleyball Championship and 2013 FIVB Volleyball Men's U21 World Championship.

Career 
Masahiro was the captain of Japan U-21 national team, since 2012 to 2013. Then, he had registered for Japan senior national team for the first time in 2016. In 2021, Masahiro was one of the setters in Japanese roster, which played in 2020 Tokyo Olympics. Japanese team advanced to the quarterfinals round in 29 years and at the end, he ranked the 7th place in the best setters category.

He transferred to Polish league, PlusLiga, playing for Cuprum Lubin in the 2021–22 season. Then he was back to play in the domestic league for JTEKT Stings.

Clubs 
  Toyo High School 
  Chuo University
  Panasonic Panthers (2016–2018) 
  Osaka Blazers Sakai (2018–2021)
  Cuprum Lubin (2021–2022)
  JTEKT Stings (2022–present)

Awards

Individual 
 2012 Asian Junior Men's Volleyball Championship – MVP award

Club
 2022 Emperor's Cup —  Champion, with JTEKT Stings

National teams 
 2012 Asian Junior Men's Volleyball Championship –  Gold Medal
 2019 Asian Men's Volleyball Championship –  Bronze Medal

Personal life 
After 2020 Summer Olympics, Masahiro became a new brand ambassador for Mizuno, a Japanese sports equipment and sportswear company.

In January 2022, he announced his marriage through his social media account.

References

1993 births
Living people
Sportspeople from Tokyo
Chuo University alumni
Japanese men's volleyball players
Olympic volleyball players of Japan
Volleyball players at the 2020 Summer Olympics
Japanese expatriate sportspeople in Poland
Expatriate volleyball players in Poland
Cuprum Lubin players
Setters (volleyball)